Tetraphenyldiphosphine is the organophosphorus compound with the formula [PPh2]2, where Ph = phenyl (C6H5).  It is a white, air-sensitive solid that dissolves in nonpolar solvents.  It is a centrosymmetric molecule with a P-P bond of 2.2592 Å.

Tetraphenyldiphosphine  is produced by reductive coupling of chlorodiphenylphosphine:
2 Ph2PCl  +  2 Na  →   Ph2P-PPh2  +  2 NaCl
The compound is used as a source of the Ph2P− group.
Ph2P-PPh2  +  2 Na  →     +  2 NaPPh2

References

Phenyl compounds
Phosphines